Limnocottus is a genus of ray-finned fish belonging to the family Cottidae, the typical sculpins. These fishes are endemic to Lake Baikal in Russia.

Species
There are currently four recognized species in this genus:
 Limnocottus bergianus Taliev, 1935
 Limnocottus godlewskii (Dybowski, 1874)
 Limnocottus griseus (Taliev, 1955)
 Limnocottus pallidus Taliev, 1948

References

Abyssocottinae
 
Scorpaeniformes genera
Fish of Lake Baikal
Taxa named by Benedykt Dybowski